Matteo Sandonà (1881–1964) was a painter born in Schio, Italy and raised in the Alps.  He immigrated with his family to New Jersey in 1894.  Two years later he returned to Europe for four years of study at the Academy of Fine Arts, Verona and in Paris under Napoleone Nani and Mose Bianchi.  After returning to the United States, he took further training at the National Academy of Design.  In 1901, he and his father settled in San Francisco.  Sandonà co-founded the California Society of Artists in 1901.  In 1903, he made the first of several trips to Hawaii, where he painted portraits of the territory’s elite.

Sandonà is best known for his luxurious thickly impastoed society portraits.  The Honolulu Museum of Art, the Oakland Museum of California (Oakland, California), the Fine Arts Museums of San Francisco, and the Springville Museum of Art (Springville, Utah) are among the public collections holding work by Matteo Sandonà. In 1903 he painted various members of the Kawananakoa family, princes of Hawai'i.

References
 Forbes, David W., Encounters with Paradise, Views of Hawaii and its People, 1778-1941, Honolulu Academy of Arts, 1992, 205-206.
 Hughes, Edan, Artists in California 1786-1940, Sacramento, Crocker Art Museum, 2002.
 Marignoli, Duccio Kaumualii & Marzia Ratti, Matteo Sandonà and Hawaii: A Capital Ambition, Honolulu, Honolulu Academy of Arts, 2007. 
 Severson, Don R. Finding Paradise: Island Art in Private Collections, University of Hawaii Press, 2002, p. 104, 108.

Footnotes

External links
 

20th-century American painters
American male painters
Hawaii artists
19th-century Italian painters
Italian male painters
20th-century Italian painters
1964 deaths
1881 births
19th-century Italian male artists
People from Schio
20th-century American male artists
20th-century Italian male artists
Italian emigrants to the United States